Olavi Salonen (born 20 December 1933 in Noormarkku) is a Finnish athlete. He is a former world record holder of men's 1500-metre run.

Biography
Salonen participated the Summer Olympic Games in 1500 m. in 1960 and 1964. At the European Athletics Championships he competed twice on 800 metres, 1958 and 1962

On 11 July 1957 Salonen ran a 1500-metre race in Turku. He finished second with the same world record time 3:40.2 as the winner Olavi Salsola. The new world record stood only for one day. Czech runner Stanislav Jungwirth ran 3:38.1 on the next day at Stará Boleslav.

See also
 1500 metres world record progression

References

External links
Olavi Salonen statistics at Tilastopaja (in Finnish)
Men's world record progression

1933 births
People from Noormarkku
World record setters in athletics (track and field)
Finnish male middle-distance runners
Olympic athletes of Finland
Living people
Athletes (track and field) at the 1960 Summer Olympics
Athletes (track and field) at the 1964 Summer Olympics
Sportspeople from Satakunta